The name Able has been used for three tropical cyclones in the Atlantic Ocean.

Hurricane Able (1950), a Category 3 hurricane that ultimately hit Nova Scotia as a tropical storm
Hurricane Able (1951), an early-season Category 1 hurricane that briefly threatened the Bahamas and North Carolina
Hurricane Able (1952), a long-lived, minimal hurricane that ultimately struck South Carolina

Atlantic hurricane set index articles